The following lists events that happened during 1994 in New Zealand.

Population
 Estimated population as of 31 December: 3,648,300
 Increase since 31 December 1993: 50,400 (1.40%)
 Males per 100 Females: 97.2

Incumbents

Regal and viceregal
Head of State – Elizabeth II
Governor-General – The Hon Dame Catherine Tizard, GCMG, GCVO, DBE, QSO

Government
The 44th New Zealand Parliament continued. Government was The National Party, led by Jim Bolger.

Speaker of the House – Peter Tapsell
Prime Minister – Jim Bolger
Deputy Prime Minister – Don McKinnon
Minister of Finance – Bill Birch
Minister of Foreign Affairs – Don McKinnon
Chief Justice — Sir Thomas Eichelbaum

Opposition leaders
See: :Category:Parliament of New Zealand, :New Zealand elections

Act – Roger Douglas
New Zealand First – Winston Peters
United Future – TBD
Labour – Helen Clark (Leader of the Opposition)
Progressives – TBD

Main centre leaders
Mayor of Auckland – Les Mills
Mayor of Hamilton – Margaret Evans
Mayor of Wellington – Fran Wilde
Mayor of Christchurch – Vicki Buck
Mayor of Dunedin – Richard Walls

Events
13 August: By-election in Selwyn after the National MP Ruth Richardson retired from politics. David Carter retained the seat for National.

Arts and literature
Christine Johnston wins the Robert Burns Fellowship

See 1994 in art, 1994 in literature, :Category:1994 books

Music

New Zealand Music Awards
Winners are shown first with nominees underneath.
Album of the Year: Straitjacket Fits – Blow
Strawpeople – World Service
The 3Ds – Venus Trail
Single of the Year: Headless Chickens – Juice / Chopper
Strawpeople – Love Explodes
Straitjacket Fits – Cat Inna Can
Best Male Vocalist: Shayne Carter (Straitjacket Fits)
Jon Toogood (Shihad)
Chris Matthews
Best Female Vocalist: Fiona McDonald (Headless Chickens)
Annie Crummer
Shona Laing
Best Group: Headless Chickens
Strawpeople
Straitjacket Fits
Most Promising Male Vocalist: Matty J (Matty J and the Soul Syndicate)
Michael Gregg & Brendan Gregg
Jason Ioasa
Most Promising Female Vocalist: Emma Paki
Jan Preston
Rima Te Wiata
Most Promising Group: Urban Disturbance
Holy Toledos
3Ds
International Achievement: Crowded House
Straitjacket Fits
Headless Chickens
Best Video: Matt Noonan / Josh Frizzell – System Virtue (Emma Paki)
Fane Flaws – The Beautiful Things (Front Lawn)
Johnny Ogilvie – Mr Moon (Headless Chickens)
Best Producer: Strawpeople – World Service
Stuart Pearce – Pacifico (Kantuta)
Jaz Coleman – Churn (Shihad)
Best Engineer: Malcolm Welsford – Churn (Shihad)
Malcolm Wellsford – You Gotta Know (Supergroove)
Graeme Myhre – Travellin' On (Midge Marsden)
Best Jazz Album: Freebass – Raw
Bluespeak – Late Last Night
Nairobi Trio – Through The Clouds
Best Classical Album: Dame Malvina Major – Casta Diva
NZ Symphony Orchestra – The Three Symphonies/ Douglas Lilburn
Tamas Vesmas – Eastern European Piano Music
Best Country Album: Al Hunter – The Singer
The Warratahs – Big Sky
Patsy Riggir – My Little Corner of the World
Best Folk Album: Steve McDonald – Sons of Somerled
Adam Bell – Summerland
Beverly Young – It's Then I Wish
Best Gospel Album: Stephen Bell-Booth – Undivided
Woodford House Chapel Choir – Celebration
Monica O'Hagan – His Love
Andrew & Saskia Smith – The Gemcutter
Polynesian Album of the Year: Pasifik MX – Manuiri
Andre Tapena – It's Raro
Mana – Mana
Best Songwriter: Emma Paki – System Virtue
Stephen Bell-Booth – Undivided
Greg Johnson – Winter Song
Best Cover: Brett Graham – Te Rangatahi
Johnny Pain & Jonathan King – Drinking With Judas (Hallelujah Picassos)
Chris Knox – Duck Shaped Pain and Gum

See: 1994 in music

Radio and television
4 March: Australian police drama Blue Heelers comes to New Zealand when the series begins screening on TV One.
4 April: US children's television series Barney & Friends first airs on TV2.
27 April: US science fiction drama The X-Files makes its New Zealand television debut on TV2.
19 July: Australian children's cartoon series The Adventures of Blinky Bill begins airing on TV2 in New Zealand (the same country where the author of the books Dorothy Wall was born).
4 September: British children's animation based on the books by Sarah Ferguson Budgie the Little Helicopter appears on New Zealand television screens for the very first time on TV3. It was also the very first British cartoon to air on TV3 as well as making the New Zealand the very first country outside of the UK to broadcast it.
8 September: Acclaimed British children's television series Thomas the Tank Engine and Friends screens on TV2 as a stand alone for the very last time.
3 December: Orange, a brand new general entertainment channel is launched by Sky.
3 December: Long running children's Saturday morning series What Now has its final broadcast for 1994 on TV2.
TV 2 begins 24-hour/7-day programming.
Newstalk ZB begins broadcasting nationwide.
The Classic Hits brand is rolled out nationwide when heritage stations operated by Radio New Zealand are rebranded as Classic Hits originally retaining local programming.

See: List of TVNZ television programming, TV3 (New Zealand), Public broadcasting in New Zealand

Film
Bread and Roses
Heavenly Creatures
Once Were Warriors

See: :Category:1994 film awards, 1994 in film, List of New Zealand feature films, Cinema of New Zealand, :Category:1994 films

Internet
See: NZ Internet History

Sport

Athletics
Paul Smith wins his first national title in the men's marathon, clocking 2:19:12 on 30 April in Rotorua, while Nyla Carroll claims her first in the women's championship (2:37:37).

Basketball
 The NBL was won by Nelson

Commonwealth Games

Cricket
Various Tours, New Zealand cricket team, Chappell–Hadlee Trophy, Cricket World Cup

Golf
New Zealand Open, Check :Category:New Zealand golfers in overseas tournaments.

Horse racing

Harness racing
 New Zealand Trotting Cup: Bee Bee Cee
 Auckland Trotting Cup: Chokin – 2nd win

Thoroughbred racing
Netball: Silver Ferns, National Bank Cup, Netball World Championships

Olympic Games

 New Zealand sends a team of seven competitors in two sports.

Paralympic Games

 New Zealand sends a team of seven competitors in one sport.

Rugby league

 The Lion Red Cup competition was introduced, with 12 teams participating. The Counties Manukau Heroes were the Minor Premiers, but were beaten 24–16 in the Grand Final by the North Harbour Sea Eagles.
Canterbury rugby league team retained the Rugby League Cup throughout the season.
16 October, New Zealand defeated Papua New Guinea 28-12
27 October, New Zealand defeated Papua New Guinea 30-16

Rugby union
:Category:Rugby union in New Zealand, Rugby Union World Cup, National Provincial Championship, :Category:All Blacks, Bledisloe Cup, Tri Nations Series, Ranfurly Shield

Shooting
Ballinger Belt – 
Andy Luckman (United Kingdom)
John Whiteman (Upper Hutt), sixth, top New Zealander

Soccer
 The Superclub competition was won by North Shore United
 The Chatham Cup is won by Waitakere City who beat Wellington Olympic 1–0 in the final.

Births

January
 1 January – Hayden McCormick, cyclist
 6 January – Samantha McClung, beauty pageant contestant
 7 January – Gemma Jones, sailor
 10 January – Tim Payne, association football player
 12 January – Simon Hickey, rugby union player
 17 January – Chance Peni, rugby league player
 20 January – Caitlin Lopes Da Silva, water polo player
 23 January – Hamish Schreurs, cyclist
 31 January
 Georgia Fabish, actor
 Rose Keddell, field hockey player

February
 5 February
 Lewis Ormond, rugby union player
 Tom Sanders, rugby union player
 15 February – Mitchell Drummond, rugby union player
 18 February – Patrick Kaufusi, rugby league player
 19 February
 Sam Lisone, rugby league player
 Brook Robertson, rower
 23 February – Patrice Siolo, rugby league player

March
 1 March – Siositina Hakeai, discus thrower
 4 March – Max O'Dowd, cricketer
 7 March – Ruby Tew, rower
 15 March – Kip Colvey, association footballer

April
 3 April – Kodi Nikorima, rugby league player
 5 April
 Sam Bosworth, coxswain
 Tom Murray, rower
 12 April – Holly Moon, gymnast
 14 April – Beau Monga, singer and beatboxer
 15 April – Katie Bowen, association footballer
 16 April – Holly Patterson, association footballer
 20 April – Tyrell Baringer-Tahiri, association footballer

May
 4 May – Joseph Tapine, rugby league player
 8 May – Luke Adams, association footballer
 9 May – Epalahame Faiva, rugby union player
 24 May – Joseph Dan-Tyrell, association footballer
 25 May
 Richie Mo'unga, rugby union player
 Josh Renton, rugby union player
 29 May – Tai Webster, basketball player

June
 7 June – Miranda Chase, water polo player
 13 June – Liam Dudding, cricketer
 22 June – Felicity Leydon-Davis, cricketer
 24 June – Mitch Evans, motor racing driver

July
 1 July – Tyla Nathan-Wong, rugby sevens and touch player
 16 July – Ken Maumalo, rugby league player
 23 July
 Selina Goddard, lawn bowler
 Thomas Kingsmill, water polo player
 25 July – Sophie Cocks, field hockey player

August
 2 August
 Manaia Cherrington, rugby league player
 Jacob Duffy, cricketer
 5 August – James Tucker, rugby union player
 7 August – Regan Ware, rugby union player
 11 August
 Anton Cooper, cross-country cyclist
 Kelsey Smith, field hockey player
 12 August – Trent Jones, BMX cyclist
 18 August – Ashleigh Ward, association footballer
 19 August – Nick Cassidy, motor racing driver

September
 3 September – Francis Molo, rugby league player
 7 September
 Herman Ese'ese, rugby league player
 Matt Vaega, rugby union player
 8 September – Leon Fukofuka, rugby union player
 12 September – Robert O'Donnell, cricketer
 14 September – Jamie Booth, rugby union player
 19 September – Matthew Hutchins, swimmer
 23 September – Malia Paseka, netball player
 26 September – Emma Robinson, swimmer

October
 1 October – Harshae Raniga, association footballer
 2 October – Trinity Spooner-Neera, rugby union player
 8 October – Jahrome Hughes, rugby league player
 10 October – Anna Tempero, gymnast
 16 October – David Fusitu'a, rugby league player
 22 October – Michael Brake, rower
 25 October – Ken McClure, cricketer
 27 October – Stephanie Skilton, association footballer
 31 October – Matthew Lewis, water polo player

November
 6 November – Christian Cullen, standardbred racehorse
 18 November – Anna-Lisa Christiane, beauty pageant contestant
 22 November – Tautalatasi Tasi, rugby league player
 23 November – Evie Millynn, association footballer
 24 November – Brew, Thoroughbred racehorse
 27 November – Racquel Sheath, cyclist

December
 2 December – Rachel Schmidt, trampolinist
 5 December – Zonda, Thoroughbred racehorse
 8 December
 Helena Gasson, swimmer
 Dylan Kennett, cyclist
 Elizabeth Thompson, field hockey player
 10 December
 Leo Carter, cricketer
 Holly Robinson, athlete
 14 December – Tim Seifert, cricketer
 16 December – Jordan Rae, gymnast
 17 December – Lloyd Perrett, rugby league player
 20 December
 Jacko Gill, shot putter
 Ryan Thomas, association football player
 22 December
 Lalakai Foketi, rugby union player
 Cameron Howieson, association football player
 23 December – David Havili, rugby union player
 24 December – Fa'amanu Brown, rugby league player
 30 December
 Tyler Boyd, association football player
 Kyle Jamieson, cricketer

Full date unknown
 Rafe Custance, actor
 Kylie Price, singer-songwriter

Deaths

January–March
 1 January – Arthur Porritt, Baron Porritt, 11th Governor-General of New Zealand (born 1900)
 2 January – Godfrey Bowen, sheep shearer (born 1922)
 4 January – Dame Eileen Mayo, artist and designer (born 1906)
 7 January – Dame Dorothea Horsman, women's rights advocate (born 1918)
 18 January – Hēmi Pōtatau, Presbyterian minister, soldier, writer (born 1904)
 25 January – Bertha Rawlinson, operatic singer, actor, composer (born 1910)
 16 February – Graeme Caughley, population ecologist and conservation biologist (born 1937)
 4 March – George Hughes, philosopher and logician (born 1918)
 10 March – D. J. M. Mackenzie, colonial medical officer (born 1905)
 20 March – John Kennedy, Roman Catholic journalist and editor (born 1926)
 26 March – Dame Whina Cooper, Māori leader (born 1895)

April–June
 17 April – Bill Dillon, politician (born 1933)
 30 April – Ina Lamason, cricketer and field hockey player (born 1911)
 2 May – Roderick Syme, agricultural instructor, mountaineer, local-body politician (born 1900)
 3 May – Francis Bell, actor (born 1944)
 5 May – Charles Diver, confectioner (born 1910)
 7 May – Nassipour, Thoroughbred racehorse (foaled 1980)
 9 May – Connie Birchfield, political activist (born 1898)
 16 May – Roy McElroy, politician, mayor of Auckland (1965–68) (born 1907)
 18 May
 Sir Harry Barker, newspaper journalist, politician (born 1898)
 Charles Turner, mechanical and civil engineer (born 1901)
 22 May – Norman Read, racewalker (born 1931)
 25 May – Jack Best, rugby union player (born 1914)
 27 May
 James McHaffie, cricketer (born 1910)
 Bert Roth, librarian, historian (born 1917)
 31 May
 Philip Blakeley, electrical engineer (born 1915)
 Cedric Firth, architect, writer (born 1908)
 Doug Freeman, cricketer (born 1914)
 1 June – Bramwell Cook, Salvation Army leader, doctor (born 1903)
 3 June – Jack Cowie, cricketer (born 1912)
 7 June – Peter Jones, rugby union player (born 1932)
 16 June – Stephen Scott, rugby union player (born 1955)
 19 June – Florence Harsant, temperance worker, writer (born 1891)
 27 June – Dame Louise Henderson, painter (born 1902)

July–September
 3 July – Felix Kelly, designer, painter and illustrator (born 1914)
 13 July – Richard B. Sibson, ornithologist (born 1911)
 19 July – Jim Bellwood, physical education teacher, sports coach (born 1912)
 25 July – Jay Epae, singer and songwriter (born 1933)
 29 July – Wiremu Te Āwhitu, Roman Catholic priest (born 1914)
 9 August – Charles Saunders, rower (born 1902)
 17 August
 Len Newell, swimmer (born 1913)
 Dick Shortt, cricket umpire (born 1922)
 Sir Fred White, physicist, ornithologist, science administrator (born 1905)
 19 August – Harry Jacks, soldier, plant pathologist, forester (born 1908)
 22 August – Sir Ralph Love, public servant, politician, Te Āti Awa leader (born 1907)
 24 August – Cecil Holmes, film director (born 1921)
 5 September
 Kathleen Curtis, Lady Rigg, mycologist (born 1892)
 Mick Williment, rugby union player (born 1940)
 6 September – Edward Gaines, Roman Catholic bishop (born 1926)
 12 September – John Chewings, politician (born 1920)

October–December
 9 October – Bill Fox, politician (born 1899)
 10 October – Nola Luxford, Hollywood actress (born 1895)
 15 October – Avis Acres, artist, writer, illustrator, conservationist (born 1910)
 24 October – Sir Guy Powles, diplomat, Ombudsman (born 1905)
 26 October 
 Ronald Dobson, rugby union player (born 1923)
 Pavel Tichý, logician, philosopher and mathematician (born 1936)
 28 October – Jock Richardson, rugby union player (born 1899)
 29 October – Gordon Cochrane, pilot (born 1916)
 2 November – John Nimmo, cricketer (born 1910)
 16 November – Ponty Reid, rugby union player (born 1929)
 22 November – Charles Upham, soldier (born 1908)
 6 December – Laura Ingram, community leader, local-body politician (born 1912)
 10 December – James Healy, geologist (born 1910)
 12 December – Frederick Turnovsky, manufacturer, entrepreneur, arts advocate (born 1916)
 16 December – Les Gandar, politician, diplomat (born 1919)
 24 December – Louise Sutherland, cyclist (born 1926)
 26 December – Sybil Lupp, mechanic, motor racing driving, garage proprietor (born 1916)
 27 December – Jimmy Kemp, cricketer (born 1918)

References

See also
List of years in New Zealand
Timeline of New Zealand history
History of New Zealand
Military history of New Zealand
Timeline of the New Zealand environment
Timeline of New Zealand's links with Antarctica

 
New Zealand
Years of the 20th century in New Zealand